Steppin' Out was the second album by the group High Inergy. It was released on Motown's Gordy label in 1978.

The album spawned the hit single "Lovin' Fever" which climbed the R&B Charts in 1978.

Track listing

Side One:
"Lovin' Fever" (Pam Sawyer, Marilyn McLeod)	(3:21)
"Hi!" (Vernessa Mitchell, Barbara Mitchell)	(2:41)
"You Captured My Heart" (Al Willis, Troy Laws) 	(3:24)
"Didn't Wanna Tell You" (William Bickelhaupt) 	(3:44)
"Everytime I See You I Go Wild" (Stevie Wonder, Sylvia Moy, Henry Cosby)	(3:36)

Side Two:
"Fly Little Blackbird" (Al Willis)	(5:01)
"Beware" (Al Willis, Gwen G. Fuqua)	(3:26)
"We Are The Future" (Jimmy Holiday, Friendly Womack, Troy Laws, Mel Bolton) 	(3:37)
"Peaceland" (Vernessa Mitchell, Barbara Mitchell)	(3:24)

Personnel
High Inergy
Barbara Mitchell
Linda Howard
Michelle Rumph
Vernessa Mitchell
with:
Charles Fearing, Dave Pruitt, Greg Poree, Jay Graydon, Mel Bolton - guitar
David Shields, Greg Middleton, James Jamerson, Scott Edwards - bass
Charles Creath, John Barnes, Kenneth Lupper, Sonny Burke, Sylvester Rivers, William Bickelhaupt - keyboards
James Gadson, Ollie E. Brown - drums
Eddie "Bongo" Brown, King Errisson - percussion
Gary Coleman - vibraphone
Bill Greene, Ernie Fields, John Stephens - saxophone
Bobby Bryant, Nolan Smith, Oscar Brashear - trumpet
George Bohanon, Ray Jackson - trombone

References

1977 albums
Motown albums
High Inergy albums